Ahmad al-Araj (b. 1486 – d. 1557) was a ruler of the Saadi Dynasty. He became ruler of Marrakesh after conquering the city in 1525. Some sources refer to him as Sultan of Marrakesh. Ahmad was a son of Abu Abdallah al-Qaim and brother of his successor Muhammad al-Shaykh, the first Saadi sultan to rule over most of Morocco.

References

1486 births
1557 deaths
15th-century Arabs
16th-century Arabs
Saadi dynasty
16th-century Moroccan people
16th-century monarchs in Africa